Grassmoor is a village in Derbyshire, England, approximately three miles to the south of Chesterfield. Its original name, according to 16th-century parish records, was Gresmore. The appropriate civil parish is called Grassmoor, Hasland and Winsick. The population of this civil parish at the 2011 Census was 3,360.  Grassmoor formerly housed many miners, however all of the local mines in the area have been closed since the mid-eighties.

Opposite Grassmoor Primary School is Barnes Park and cricket pitch. Many local cricket matches are played on the park and it is also host to an annual Summer Fete.

Parish council
Grassmoor Parish Council covers the village of Grassmoor and also the areas of Winsick and Hasland. The area covered by this Parish when combined with the area covered by the Parish of Temple Normanton forms Grassmoor district electoral ward. The Parish is part of Sutton county electoral division.

Five Pits Trail
The Five Pits Trail is a five and half mile off-road surfaced route from Grassmoor Country Park to Tibshelf Ponds.

The Five Pits Trail is so named as it 5 mines that interlink local coal mines Coalfields. The former collieries had a long death, with deep mines gradually being replaced by huge opencast workings, which had a lifespan of less than 20 years. Reclamation and conservation over the past 30 years have seen spoil tips and wasteland replaced by hay meadows and woodland.

Areas of water have attracted upwards of 200 species of birds. The bird reserves at Williamthorpe Ponds are partially filled by water pumped at a constant 10 °C which attracts many birds, particularly in winter.

Lagoons
Grassmoor lagoons were formed in spoil tips at the former Grassmoor Colliery, which operated on the site from the 1840s until its closure in 1967. When British Coal opened the Avenue Coking Works nearby, it used the lagoon area to treat waste liquid from the coking works.  During this time, large amounts of coal tar sludge from the works settled in the lagoons. The Avenue Coking Works closed in 1993, and Derbyshire County Council took over the lagoons site later the same year. Derbyshire County Council owns the Grassmoor Lagoons site and has secured funding to remediate the lagoons area. Once this is achieved, the council intends to incorporate the area back into the Grassmoor Country Park. This was due to begin in 2009, however no progress has been made as of March 2018.

Notable people
Paul Burrell grew up in the village, before eventually becoming Diana, Princess of Wales' butler.

Attractions
Grassmoor Primary School is government funded. Grassmoor Community Centre, hosts community events such as small fairs.

References

External links

Villages in Derbyshire
Towns and villages of the Peak District